Lorenzo Gramiccia (1702–1796) was an Italian painter, active in a late-Baroque.

He was born in Cave, Lazio, near Palestrina in the Lazio, but is mainly known for his work in the north of Italy. He trained in Rome, but did not pursue Neoclassical styles of painting. He painted in Venice for the churches of Santi Giovanni e Paolo, San Simone Profeta, and in 1777 for San Giacomo dall’Orio. He painted a Roman Charity (circa 1740–1750) found at the Accademia Carrara of Bergamo.

He died in Rome.

Sources

18th-century Italian painters
Italian male painters
Painters from Venice
Italian Baroque painters
1702 births
1796 deaths
18th-century Italian male artists